The Kingdom of Rajpipla or Rajpipla State was a princely state, with full internal jurisdiction, in India ruled by the Gohil Rajput dynasty for over 600 years from around 1340 till 1948. It was the largest State, and the only first-class State, of the Rewa Kantha Agency.. Among Gujarat States (as distinct from Kathiawar or Saurashtra States), Rajpipla State was the second-largest after Baroda (Vadodara) in terms of size and importance. The Gohil Rajput dynasty of Rajpipla survived the onslaught of the Sultans of Ahmedabad and the Mughals during the mediaeval period, and the Gaekwars of Baroda and the British in the modern period, to emerge as a well-administered State with contemporary infrastructure, policies and practices by the time it was merged with the Union of India on 10 June 1948.

The Rajpipla princely State was situated largely between two important rivers of western India—the Narmada and the Tapti, with the Satpura range in the south. Spanning an area of over 1500 square miles (4,000 km2), of which 600 mi2 (1550 km2) were forests and the rest fertile agricultural plains and river valleys, Rajpipla grew to be one of the most prosperous princely states in Gujarat, second only to Baroda. It was also famous for its agate mines.
It is now part of the state of Gujarat. Its capital town of Rajpipla (Nandod or New Rajpipla) is now headquarters of the Narmada district.

History
Chokrana, a Parmar Rajput prince, originally hailing from the ruling family of Ujjain in Malwa (now the western part of the state of Madhya Pradesh), was in the early part of the fourteenth century ruling over the principality of Rajpipla, with his capital at Dev Chhatra (Abode of the Gods) high up in the western Satpuras and deep inside the forests, overlooking the holy river Narmada. Chokrana Parmar's daughter was married to the legendary Mokhdaji, the Gohil Rajput warrior chief of Ghogha in Gohilwar, Saurashtra. Chokrana, who had no male heir, adopted his grandson Samarsinhji, younger son of Mokhdaji Gohil. Mokhdaji's first wife was a Sarviya princess of Hathasani and their son Dungarsinhji succeeded as chief of Ghogha, part of which later became the princely state of Bhavnagar.

Samarsinhji acceded to the gadi (throne) of Rajpipla around 1340, assuming the name Arjunsinhji. From then, Rajpipla was ruled by the Gohil Rajput dynasty. The Kul Devi (family deity) of the royal family of Rajpipla is Shri Harsiddhi Mataji, the original temple being in Ujjain. It is said that Maharana Verisalji I of Rajpipla built the temple of Harsiddhi Mataji at Rajpipla in the 18th century.

Gohil Rajput dynasty and clan

The origin of the Gohil Rajput clan goes back to the sixth century AD when Muhideosur Gohadit or Guhil, born in 542 A.D. after the sack of Vallabhi and the only male survivor of the clan, went on to become chief of an area near modern Idar in Gujarat in the year 556 A.D, and held sway till his death in 603 A.D. His descendant Kalbhoj or Bappa Rawal seized Chittor and became ruler of Mewar in 734 A.D. A little more than  centuries later in 973 A.D., Salivahan, the Gohil ruler of Mewar, and 11th in descent to Bappa Rawal, moved away with part of the clan from Chittor to Juna Khergarh (present-day Bhalotra near Jodhpur) on the River Luni in Marwar, leaving behind his son Shaktikumar with the remaining members of his kin. There is still a village there called 'Gohilon ki dhani'. Thus for about two-and-a-half centuries, both Mewar and Marwar were ruled by the Gohil Rajput dynasty.

Later, after Alauddin Khalji ravaged Chittor in 1303, the Gohils of Mewar regrouped and assumed the name Sisodia. The capital was shifted from Chittor to Udaipur in 1559.

Meanwhile, the Gohils who had migrated under Salivahan continued to rule over Marwar. After the formation of the Delhi Sultanate in the early part of the thirteenth century the Rathore clan, pushed out of Kannauj, travelled to Marwar. There were fierce clashes between the Gohils and Rathores in Marwar, which resulted in the death of the respective chiefs Maheshdasji Gohil and Siyaji Rathore. The Gohil clan, under their chief Sejakji, then marched back to Saurashtra, after five centuries, where they became governors of the Solankis, a branch of the Chalukyas. Soon, they carved out their own principalities. The most famous of their chiefs during this period were Sejakji, Ranoji and Mokhdaji, and the princely States their descendants carved out were Bhavnagar State, Rajpipla State, Palitana State, Lathi, and Vallabhipur or Vala State.

Those were turbulent medieval times and it was not easy for the Gohils to retain their hold over Rajpipla. They had to face several invasions from the sultans of Ahmedabad, the Mughal emperors and later the Marathas, even losing their principality for brief periods, each time coming back to power by joining forces with the hill tribes (mostly Bhils) and carrying out guerrilla attacks. In 1730, with the weakening of the Mughal Empire, the 26th Gohil ruler of Rajpipla, Maharana Verisalji I stopped paying tribute to the Mughals, and his son Maharana Jeetsinhji wrested back Nandod taluka and shifted the capital from Junaraj up in the Satpuras to Nandod or new Rajpipla town, in the plains on the banks of the river Karjan, a tributary of the Narmada.

When the Marathas grew powerful in the 18th century, the Gaekwars of Baroda State exacted tribute from Rajpipla. The stranglehold of the Gaekwars was cast aside with the intervention of the British, and accession of the 33rd Gohil ruler Maharana Verisalji II on the gadi of Rajpipla. During the 1857 Mutiny, Rajpipla under Verisalji II rebelled, and for many months relieved itself of the sway of the British. It was not surprising, therefore, that the agitated English, having quelled the Mutiny and transferred power to the Crown, forced Verisalji II to step aside and make way for his son Maharana Gambhirsinhji in 1860 AD.

1900s and Maharaja Vijaysinhji
The golden period of Rajpipla during the modern era began when Maharana Gambhirsinhji's son, Maharana Chhatrasinhji, the 35th Gohil ruler of Rajpipla came to the gadi in 1897 A.D. Rajpipla witnessed rapid progress over the next half-century. Knighthood was conferred on Maharana Chhatrasinhji (KCIE) as a result of his efficient administration. This included laying of the 60-mile (90 kilometres) railway line connecting Rajpipla to Ankleshwar on the main Delhi-Ahmedabad-Bombay line, initiated in the first year of his reign, and massive famine relief during the period 1899–1902. Maharana Chhatrasinhji was one of the pioneers of motoring in India, owning cars like the Wolseley 6 hp 1903–04, Armstrong Siddeley 15 hp 1906 and Clement Bayard 16 hp.

But the builder of contemporary, affluent Rajpipla was his son, Maharana Vijaysinhji, who ascended the gadi in 1915 A.D. Educated at Rajkumar College, Rajkot and a member of the Imperial Cadet Corps, Dehra Dun, Maharana Vijaysinhji proved to be a great administrator, assisted by his karbhari Rasikbhai Dubla. Knighthood was conferred on Maharaja Vijaysinhji (KCSI), and he received the hereditary title of Maharaja. The gun salute for the ruler of Rajpipla was raised from 11 to 13. During World War I Rajpipla State supplied many recruits. In recognition of his services Maharaja Vijaysinhji received the honorary rank of captain in the British Army.

Maharaja Sir Vijaysinhji built a huge, exquisitely-designed high school where only nominal fees were charged, and introduced free primary education and scholarships. He constructed a civil hospital, maternity hospital, five dispensaries and a veterinary hospital in the State. A criminal-and-civil court was established, pensions were paid to public servants, and the salaries of the police and military were increased. Maharaja Vijaysinhji ordered the laying of extensive public works and good motorable roads. He added the 40-mile (64 kilometres) Jhagadia-Netrang section to Rajpipla State Railway established during his father's reign. He also set up a 19-mile (31 kilometres) steam railroad and tramway connecting the towns along the river Narmada with villages in the interior, and a power house supplying electricity and water to Rajpipla town. His town planning in 1927 was far-sighted, and builders were given permission to construct, conditional to leaving 3 to 4 feet (about 1 metre) space for future widening of roads. The designs of new buildings were well integrated and in harmony with the surroundings. 

Even though taxes were reduced in terms of percentage, the revenue of the State increased from Rupees 1,300,000 (Rupees 13 lakhs) to Rupees 2,700,000 (Rupees 27 lakhs) per annum in the period 1915–1930, and rose to Rupees 5,072,613 (nearly Rupees 51 lakhs) in 1945–46, which was the basic year for calculation of privy purse when the State was merged with the Indian Union later in 1948. Maharaja Vijaysinhji regularised the land revenue system, and his relief efforts during droughts and floods drew wide appreciation. With a keen interest in agriculture, he improved the quality of cotton by introducing long-staple cotton known as "1027 A.I.F" in 1919-20 which increased the income of farmers manifold, and also grains and fruits grown in his territory. 

Sports were Maharaja Vijaysinhji's passion. He was a keen horseman and maintained one of the finest stables of race horses in India and England, marked by quality and not quantity. Maharaja Vijaysinhji won the first Indian Derby in 1919 when his horse Tipster led the pack at the finish. His horse Embargo won the Irish Derby in 1926 and Grand Prix in Belgium in 1927. Other horses, like Melesigenes, won him nearly all the big prizes in races at Bombay, Poona and other Indian courses, and in 1932-33 he topped the racing events in India. But, doubtlessly, his best horse was Windsor Lad, that won the coveted Epsom Derby of England in 1934. Maharaja Vijaysinhji is still the only Indian owner to have won the English Derby, considered the greatest horse race in the world, cheered on by an estimated quarter to half a million people on the course that day. King George V and Queen Mary of Britain, who watched the race along with other members of the Royal Family, invited Maharaja Vijaysinhji to the Royal Box and felicitated him on this brilliant victory. In the process the Maharaja completed a brilliant hat-trick of Derby wins: the first-ever Indian Derby, the Irish Derby and the coveted Epsom Derby of England, making him arguably the greatest Indian racehorse owner.

After his brilliant victory in the Epsom Derby, Maharaja Vijaysinhji began construction of what became one of the finest palaces of 20th century India, the magnificent Indrajit-Padmini Mahal, also known as Vadia Palace. Built in predominantly Indo-Saracenic style with a few western features, using the finest Italian marble and Burma teak, the exquisite largely centrally air-conditioned Art Deco palace has two huge wooden spiral staircases and 1,000 doors and windows, and beautiful frescoes in various themes on the walls and ceiling. Completed in 1939, this marvel of architecture came to be dubbed as 'The Taj of Gujarat'. 

Maharaja Vijaysinhji spent much of the summer sporting season in England, and returned to India in the winter when he encouraged outdoor sports like cricket, football and hockey. Sports were made compulsory for students of Rajpipla State. He equipped Rajpipla with a polo ground and gymkhana club. A unique feature of the Rajpipla royal family was its polo team comprising Maharaja Vijaysinhji and his three sons (then) Yuvraj Rajendrasinhji, Maharajkumar Pramodsinhji and Maharajkumar Indrajitsinhji. Having a passion for cars like his father, Maharaja Vijaysinhji owned twelve Rolls-Royce cars, from the Silver Ghost 1913 to the Phantom III 1937, which were based at his palaces in Rajpipla, and stately homes in Bombay and Windsor. In his garages could be found several makes and models of the finest cars.

Having already gifted an aircraft to the Imperial Aircraft Flotilla during the First World War, Maharaja Vijaysinhji donated three Spitfire fighter planes, named 'Rajpipla', 'Windsor Lad' and 'Embargo', and a Hawker Hurricane aircraft 'Rajpipla II' when the Second World War was at its zenith. He was awarded the Knight Grand Cross (GBE).

Maharaja Vijaysinhji built an aerodrome in Rajpipla on a 125-acre site on the banks of the River Karjan in the late 1920s. This became defunct since merger of Rajpipla State with the Union of India in 1948. But after the building of the Statue of Unity in close proximity to Rajpipla, Government of Gujarat decided to revive this in 2018, and build a new Rajpipla airport there.  

The Maharaja also had surveys carried out to build four dams across the Narmada, and also the Karjan, at places where both banks of the rivers fell in Rajpipla territory, to facilitate irrigation and generate electricity, and was in the process of raising investment for them. These were precursors to the present-day gigantic Sardar Sarovar project and Karjan dam.

Seeing the early signs of the winds of change, Maharaja Vijaysinhji formed a legislative assembly in Rajpipla State, which was inaugurated on 10 December 1932, the 17th anniversary of his formal accession to the gadi (or throne) of Rajpipla. He gave a fillip in Rajpipla in the 1940s, to the movement for 'responsible government' which was taking shape in the Indian princely States alongside the freedom movement in British India. After independence of India in 1947, when it came to talks regarding the accession of princely States to the Union of India, the Ministry of States under Sardar Vallabhbhai Patel decided that talks with the rulers of Gujarat States would not be held at the Bombay Secretariat. Instead the Ministry requested Maharaja Vijaysinhji to convene the meetings at his own residence 'Palm Beach' at Nepeansea Road, Bombay. There were discussions under the chairmanship of Maharaja Vijaysinhji for three days, which went on till late at night. 

At the end of it, Maharaja Vijaysinhji read out the following statement:
"We have the pleasure to inform you that, as rulers of Gujarat States, we believe our Mother Country and particularly Gujarat looks up to us to make all sacrifices in the wider interests of India as a whole. We, therefore, have cheerfully responded to the call of duty and decided to take the first step in forming the province of Maha Gujarat by integrating our States with the province of Bombay. We invoke God's blessings on our decision."

Maharaja Vijaysinhji, thus, readily handed over to the forces of Indian democracy, his beloved Rajpipla State that he had nurtured for nearly 33 years, along with Rupees 2,800,000 (Rs. 2.8 million or Rupees 28 lakhs) that were deposited in the State treasury. With the population around 3,00,000 inhabitants, the State was merged with the Indian Union on 10 June 1948, bringing to an end the 600-year rule of the Gohil Rajput dynasty over Rajpipla.

Maharaja Vijaysinhji passed away at his estate 'The Manor' at Old Windsor in England in April 1951, and was cremated at Rampura on the banks of the holy river Narmada, 18 kilometres from his former capital amid a huge gathering of the people of Rajpipla.

Rajpipla after 1971

The title of Maharaja of Rajpipla passed on to Maharaja Vijaysinhji's eldest son Rajendrasinhji, and after his demise in 1963 to Raghubir Singh. The Indian princely order was finally abolished in 1971. Raghubir Singh's only son Manvendra Singh Gohil caused a stir in 2006 when he openly declared in the media that he is a homosexual. Raghubir Singh has a daughter Minaxi who married Digvijay Chand of Chenani in 1992. They have a son Ranajay Chand and a daughter, Dharini.

Maharaja Vijaysinhji's second son Maharajkumar Pramodsinhji joined the Indian Administrative Service (IAS) and served in the Orissa cadre. He had four daughters Yogeshwari, Maheshwari, Durgeshwari and Krishna.

Maharaja Vijaysinhji's third son Maharajkumar Indrajitsinhji was one of India's finest polo players in the 1950s and a gifted artist whose paintings still adorn the walls of Mayo College, Ajmer. Maharajkumar Indrajitsinhji's two sons are Indra Vikram Singh and Indra Vadan Singh. Indra Vikram Singh is a well-known writer and publisher, and has authored ten books, nine of them on the game of cricket, and one entitled 'A Maharaja's Turf' on the triumph of his grandfather Maharaja Vijaysinhji in the Epsom Derby of 1934. Among his other books are several on the cricket World Cup, and 'Don's Century' which is a biography of the legendary Sir Donald Bradman and also a panorama of batting from the 1860s till the present times. Indra Vadan Singh has inherited his father's artistic talents, and runs his own tea blending, marketing and export business.

The well known cricketer K.S. Duleepsinhji, nephew of the famous H.H. Maharaja Jam Saheb K.S. Ranjitsinhji of Nawanagar or Ranji, married Maharaja Vijaysinhji's cousin Rajkumari Jayaraj Kunverba of Rajpipla.

The major part of the erstwhile princely state of Rajpipla now forms the Narmada district in Gujarat, with Rajpipla town as its headquarters, while some portions fall in Vadodara and Bharuch districts.

List of rulers
Rulers bore the title Maharana until 1921, thereafter Maharaja.
 About 1340 -              Arjunsinhji (Younger son of Mokhdaji, Gohil Rajput Chief of Ghogha in Saurashtra. Adopted by his maternal grandfather Chokrana Parmar) 
                           Bhansinhji 
 - 1421                    Gomelsinhji (d.1421) 
 1421 -                    Vijaypalji 
 1463                      Harisinhji (d. 1463)
 1463 - 1526               Bhimdev (d. 1526) 
 1526 - 1543               Raisinhji (d. 1543)  
 1543 -                    Karanbaji 
                           Abhayraj Ji
                           Sujansinhji 
                           Bhairavsinhji 
 1583 - 1593               Pruthuraj Ji (d. 1593)  
 1593 -                    Deepsinhji 
                           Durgshahji   
                           Mohraj Ji 
                           Raishalji 
                           Chandrasinhji  
                           Gambhirsinhji I 
                           Subheraj Ji   
                           Jaisinhji   
                           Malraj 
                           Surmalji   
                           Udekaranji  
                           Chandrabhaji
16.. – 1705                Chatrasalji                        (d. 1705)
1705 – 1715                Verisalji I                        (d. 1715)
1715 - 1730                Jitsinhji                          (d. 1730)   
1730 - 1754                Gomalsinghji                       (d. 1754) 
1754 (6 months)            Dalilsinhji (usurper)
1754 - 1764                Pratapsinhji                       (d. 1764) 
1764 - 1786                Raisinhji                          (d. 1786) 
1786 - 15 Jan 1803         Ajabsinhji                         (b. 1750 - d. 1803) 
1793 – 15 Jan 1803         Naharsinhji -Regent                (b. c.1780 - d. 18..)
15 Jan 1803 – 10 May 1810  Ramsinhji                          (d. 1810)              
10 May 1810 -  9 Aug 1821  Naharsinhji                        (s.a.) 
 9 Aug 1821 – 17 Nov 1860  Verisalji II                       (b. 1808 - d. 1868)
17 Nov 1860 – 10 Jan 1897  Gambhirsinhji II                   (b. 1847 - d. 1897) 
1884 - 10 Jan 1897         British administrators
- William Arthur Salmon  (Jul 1884 - 1885)
- Edward Vincent Stace (1885-1886) (b. 1841 - d. 1903)
- Alexander Francis Maconochie     (b. 1862 - d. 1934)  (1886-1887) 
- Alexander Shewan (Nov 1887 - 1894)
  - Willoughby Pitcairn Kennedy      (b. 18.. - d. 1928)  (Oct 1894 - Jul 1895)
- Francis William Snell   (Aug 1895 - Nov 1897)
10 Jan 1897 – 26 Sep 1915  Chhatrasinhji                      (b. 1862 - d. 1915)   (from 12 Dec 1911, Sir Chhatrasinhji)
26 Sep 1915 –  10 Jun 1948 Vijaysinhji                        (b. 1890 - d. 1951)   (from 1 Jan 1925, Sir Vijayasinhji Chhatrasinhji

References

External links

Interpreter of our royal heritage
Rider on the storm
Rajpipla State Post
 Indra Vikram Singh; 29 July 1955
 Rajpipla State Railway
 Indra Vikram Singh's heritage and myriad strokes
 Indra Vikram Singh's space
 Fighter aircraft donated by Maharaja Vijaysinhji of Rajpipla during the Second World War 
 Revival of Rajpipla airport after 70 years
 The exquisite vintage and classic cars of the Rajpipla royal family
 Centenary of coronation of Maharana Vijaysinhji, the 36th Gohil Rajput ruler of Rajpipla, on 10 December 2015
 Indrajit-Padmini Mahal (Vadia Palace), Rajpipla…..a marvel of architecture
 Birth Anniversary of Maharana Shri Sir Vijaysinhji, GBE, KCSI, Maharaja of Rajpipla
 From merger to Statue, Rajpipla comes a full circle after seven decades
 93rd birth anniversary of my father Maharajkumar Indrajitsinhji of Rajpipla
 
 

States and territories established in 1340
Princely states of India
Narmada district
History of Gujarat
Rajputs
Gohils
14th-century establishments in India
1340 establishments in Asia
1948 disestablishments in India